Sivas Nuri Demirag Airport  is an airport located  northwest of Sivas, Turkey.

Location 
Nuri Demirağ Airport is located to hill of Merakum the northwest of Sivas. The airport is away from the city and at the same time relatively high so the location where the current position is planned as a NATO base in construction period. The nearest highway to the airport, 13 km south of the D-200 (E-88) Sivas-Ankara highway.

Overview
The airport was opened to air traffic in 1957 to be used for military purposes; in 1990, DHMİ (State Airports Authority) built a  terminal building to begin to serve the civilian air traffic.

Sivas Nuri Demirag Airport closed air traffic with decision of cabinet on 31 January 2002, and opened air traffic with decision of cabinet on 17 October 2003. The airport was closed again to air traffic on 15 April 2006 due to the repair of the runway and expansion work, and 01/19 width of the runway has been removed from 30 meters to 45 meters. The new terminal building opened for use on 18 December 2010 with an annual capacity of 3 million passengers. The original terminal building meets the standards of today's airport was built as an architecture with a modern facility.

History 

1957 – It was built to be used by NATO.

1990 – The first terminal building was made by DHMI.

2002 – Airport was closed to air transport because it did not profit by the government of the time was.

2003 – Airways due to intensive use across the country, was opened to the air transport again.

2006 – Starting work on the Runway extension 30 meters wide runway extended to 45 meters, and lighting systems were established at the same time.

2007 – On June 23, 2007, by an international expedition made the first flight with Stuttgart.

2010 – The annual capacity of 3,000,000 passengers in the new terminal building was completed and opened. The re-opened airport name has been changed to Sivas Nuri Demirag Airport.

2011 – May 22, 2011 Sunday, charter and scheduled 52 flight was performed due to the Fenerbahçe football match.

2012 – Customs services should be transferred except for continuous duty applications starting international flights passengers and cargo services has been given.

2013 – Airport has been barrier free.

Airlines and destinations

These are the airlines and destinations of Sivas Airport:

Traffic statistics

Passenger

The following data comes from the DHMİ (State Airports Authority) statistics:

Cargo

Commercial Aircraft

All Aircraft

Transportation
There are passenger shuttles from the airport both Sivas and Tokat to airport operated by Havaş.

References

External links

 

Buildings and structures in Sivas Province
Airports in Turkey
Transport in Sivas Province